Maadhav Deochake is an Indian film and television actor, and model. He participated in Bigg Boss Marathi 2.

Personal life 
Deochake married Bageshri Joshi in 2014.

Career 
He made his television debut with Kata Rute Kunala in 2006. In 2008, He played a role Mohan Nanawati in Hamari Devrani. He also acted in Bind Banunga Ghodi Chadhunga. He made his film debut with Majha Me in 2013 since then he has acted in Gondan, Chintamani, Aga Bai Arechyaa 2 and Citizen, Journey Premachi and FU: Friendship Unlimited.

He has also appeared in the serials Saraswati, Devyani, Tujha Majaa Breakup, Dilya Ghari Tu Sukhi Raha

He also participated in Bigg Boss Marathi 2 and evicted on Day 63. Currently, he is cast in the movie Vijeta.

Filmography

References

External links 

 

Marathi actors
Living people
Male actors in Marathi television
Male actors in Hindi television
Male actors in Marathi cinema
Bigg Boss Marathi contestants
Year of birth missing (living people)